John Richardson Harris (October 22, 1790 – August 21, 1829) was an early settler of Mexican Texas and the namesake of Harris County, Texas. He founded the town of Harrisburg, Texas and Harris County, Texas is named in his honor.

Family life
John Richardson Harris was born on October 22, 1790 to John and Mary (Richardson) Harris in Cayuga, New York. After serving in the War of 1812, he married Jane Birdsall, and they took residence near Waterloo, New York. Their first sons were born there: DeWitt Clinton Harris and Lewis Birdsall Harris. The family migrated to Ste. Genevieve, Missouri in 1819, where Mary Jane Harris and John Birdsall Harris were born.

Gone to Texas

Harris prepared to locate to Texas at the urging of Moses Austin. To prepare for this gamble, he resettled his family in upstate New York. In 1823, he sailed his boat from New Orleans to Buffalo Bayou, where he scouted locations for a trading post.  
Harris was granted a league of land  at Buffalo Bayou on 16 August 1824. He contracted for a town plat of Harrisburg in 1826, while he established a trading post and a grist mill there.  He named the new town for Harrisburg, Pennsylvania, the namesake of his great-grandfather. In addition to the grist mill, he ran a saw mill with the assistance of his two brothers, David Harris and William Plunkett Harris, and his business partner, Robert Wilson. They also offered carpentry and blacksmithing services. Harris and Wilson managed a small fleet of sailing ships, which imported trade goods from the United States and Mexico, and exported cotton and lumber. John Richardson and David Harris founded a second trading post at Bell’s Landing, Texas.

Death and legacy
Harris started building what was the first steam saw mill in Texas. With machine belts needed to complete the project, he sailed to New Orleans. He arrived amidst a yellow fever epidemic and died there on August 21, 1829.

In 1833, two parties filed claims on the John Harris Richardson estate. Wilson and William Plunkett Harris claimed the real estate and equipment as their own. John Richardson Harris’s widow, Jane Harris, and DeWitt Clinton Harris arrived in Texas for the first time to make a competing claim. In 1836, Augustus Chapman Allen and John Kirby Allen approached the Harrises to make a bid on the  Harrisburg site, but ownership of the property had still not been settled. By 1838, Mary Jane Harris and her family constructed a house on that property and reorganized the town in order to sell lots.

Harris County, Texas was named for John Richardson Harris.

References

1790 births
1829 deaths
Ship owners
Mexican businesspeople
American city founders